Fast and Fearless is a 1924 American silent Western film directed by Richard Thorpe, written by Betty Burbridge and starring Buffalo Bill, Jr. and Jean Arthur. The film is mostly lost: only reel 2 out of 5 has been saved at the Library of Congress.

Plot
Lightning Bill Lewis (Bill, Jr.) pursues to capture a gang led by Pedro Gómez (Magrill) that has been terrorizing a border town. When Pedro captures his girlfriend (Arthur), Bill uses the help of Captain Duerta (Riverto) to stop Pedro. In the end, Pedro is caught by Mexican soldiers and Bill is free to marry his girl.

Cast
 Buffalo Bill, Jr. as Lightning Bill Lewis
 Jean Arthur as Mary Brown
 William H. Turner as Judge Brown
 George Magrill as Pedro Gómez
 Julian Rivero as Captain Duerta
 Emily Barrye as Blanca
 Kewpie King as Fatty Doolittle
 Steve Clemente as Gonzales
 Victor Allen as Sheriff Hawkins

References

External links
 

1924 films
1924 Western (genre) films
1924 lost films
American black-and-white films
Films directed by Richard Thorpe
Lost Western (genre) films
Lost American films
Silent American Western (genre) films
1920s English-language films
1920s American films